Meena Vala is a village near Rajpura, Pali district, Rajasthan.

References 

Villages in Pali district